Li Rui (born 1949 in Beijing) is a short-story writer and novelist from China. He is best known for his Houtu series of short stories, which won the China Times Literary Prize as well as the 8th National Award for best short stories.

He has published five novels, several novellas and several volumes of short stories. In 2004, Li won the French Ordre des Arts et des Lettres award for his contributions to arts and literature.

In 2007, the Open University of Hong Kong awarded him the degree of D.Litt. honoris causa.

References

External links 

1949 births
Living people
Chinese male short story writers
Short story writers from Beijing
International Writing Program alumni
20th-century Chinese short story writers
20th-century Chinese male writers
People's Republic of China short story writers